Bagram (Pashto/) is a town and seat in Bagram District in Parwan Province of Afghanistan, about 60 kilometers north of the capital Kabul. It is the site of an ancient city located at the junction of the Ghorband and Panjshir Valley, near today's city of Charikar, Afghanistan. The location of this historical town made it a key passage from Ancient India along the Silk Road, leading westwards through the mountains towards Bamiyan, and north over the Kushan Pass to the Baghlan Valley and past the Kushan archeological site at Surkh Kotal, to the commercial centre of Balkh and the rest of northern Afghanistan. Bagram was also a capital of Kushan empire

Climate

According to the Köppen climate classification system, Bagram has a hot-summer humid continental climate (Dsa) with brief, but cold winters and long, hot and dry summers. Precipitation is most likely between the months of October and April. Dust storms and sand storms occur frequently during certain times of the year and the city is often blanketed by snow in winter months. The annual mean temperature is

History

Ancient history

The ancient city of Kapisi is identified with present-day Bagram. The figures of ancient Buddhist and Hindu sculptures show that the city was initially ruled by Indic people who have either migrated or intermingled with the Iranian populations who moved into the region like Kambojas from Bactria.   

While the Diadochi were warring amongst themselves, the Mauryan Empire was developing in the northern part of the Indian subcontinent. The founder of the empire, Chandragupta Maurya, confronted a Macedonian invasion force led by Seleucus I in 305 BC and following a brief conflict, an agreement was reached as Seleucus ceded Gandhara and Arachosia (centered on ancient Kandahar) and areas south of Bagram (corresponding to the extreme south-east of modern Afghanistan) to the Mauryans. During the 120 years of the Mauryans in southern Afghanistan, Buddhism was introduced and eventually become a major religion alongside Zoroastrianism and local pagan beliefs.

Bagram became the capital of the Kushan Empire in the first century. The "Bagram treasure" as it has been called, is indicative of intense commercial exchanges between all the cultural centers of the classical time, with the Kushan empire at the junction of the land and sea trade between the east and west. However, the works of art found in Bagram, such as the Begram ivories, are either quite purely Hellenistic, Roman, Chinese or Indian, with only little indications of the cultural syncretism found in Greco-Buddhist art.

Islamic conquest

The Islamic conquest of Afghanistan and the adjoining Pashtun region began in seventh century right after conquest of Persia. However, the complete Islamization of Afghanistan wasn't achieved until the Ghaznavid rule. The modern-day town is believed to be founded by Babur at the site of the ancient city. In Babur's memoirs, the Baburnama, the emphasis of his visit in 1519 is on the colony of Hindu ascetics at Gurh Kattri (Kur Katri), who fascinated him.

Recent history

Bagram hosts the strategic Bagram Airfield, from which most US air activity in Afghanistan took place. The runway was built in 1976, and it was a Soviet air base from 1979 to 1989. There was also a Provincial Reconstruction Team when the US were present in Afghanistan and implemented their counter-insurgency strategy.

Bagram is also the location of the Parwan Detention Facility; this detention facility was the last prison in Afghanistan under management of the US. It was handed back to the Afghan government on 25 March 2013. The detention centre had earlier come into the attention of the news media as it was claimed that prisoners were tortured (see the article Bagram torture and prisoner abuse). At the time of the hand-over of the facility, human-rights groups like Amnesty International have raised concerns about the treatment of prisoners there.

On December 21, 2015, Bagram was the site of a suicide bombing killing 6 people.

On July 1, 2021, US troops departed from the air base, abandoning the outpost over to the Afghan government after 20 years.  According to the Afghan commander at the time, the US evacuated the base during the night without any previous official notice to the Afghan army.

See also
 Bagram District
 Parwan Province

Footnotes

References
 The Ancient Geography of India. I. The Buddhist Period, Including the Campaigns of Alexander, and the Travels of Hwen-Thsang. Alexander Cunningham. Trübner and Co., London. Complete and unabridged reprint (2006): Low Price Publications, Delhi.
Afghanistan: Hidden Treasures from the National Museum, Kabul (2008). Eds., Friedrik Hiebert and Pierre Cambon. National Geographic, Washington, D.C. .

External links 

Map of Bagram and the surrounding area , Afghanistan Information Management Service (AIMS)
Human Rights First; Undue Process: An Examination of Detention and Trials of Bagram Detainees in Afghanistan in April 2009 (2009)
Human Rights First; Arbitrary Justice: Trial of Guantánamo and Bagram Detainees in Afghanistan (2008)

Populated places in Parwan Province
Populated places along the Silk Road